The Second Gallagher Ministry was the 12th ministry of the Government of the Australian Capital Territory, and was led by Labor Chief Minister Katy Gallagher and her deputy Andrew Barr. It was appointed on 7 November 2012, following the 2012 general election held two weeks earlier.

The previous First Gallagher Ministry contained only members of the ACT Labor Party. In the 2012 general election, neither of the territory's two major parties (Labor and Liberals) had won sufficient number of seats to form government in their own right and would need the support of the sole Greens representative Shane Rattenbury. Rattenburry came to a formal parliamentary agreement with the Labor Party in order to form a coalition government, which meant that he would be appointed to the cabinet, and implement nearly 100 policies and reforms.

First arrangement
Following the 2012 general election, the Greens-Labor agreement allowed Labor to retain government and guaranteed Shane Rattenbury's position in the Ministry. Gallagher appointed herself, her deputy Andrew Barr, Rattenbury and two other incumbent ministers into the Ministry without portfolio on 7 November 2012. Incumbent minister Chris Bourke was not reappointed to the Ministry.

Portfolios were allocated two days later on 9 November 2012. The arrangement lasted until 6 July 2014.

Second arrangement
On 7 July 2014, Mick Gentleman was appointed to the Ministry, increasing the Ministry size to 6. The arrangement lasted until Gallagher resigned as Chief Minister in December 2014, and her successor Andrew Barr formed the First Barr Ministry on 15 December 2014.

References

Australian Capital Territory ministries
Australian Labor Party ministries in the Australian Capital Territory